Al Kharjah is a town in Iraq, that is south of Samara. 

Al Kharjah is located at Latitude33.9833°, Longitude. 44.2167°  and is near Balad, Iraq.

References

Populated places in Saladin Governorate
Cities in Iraq